Henry Anderson (1484 – 1559) was an English politician who represented Newcastle-upon-Tyne and served once as Sheriff, as Mayor four times, was elected to the House of Commons in the Reformation Parliament in 1529, and was the first Governor of the Merchant Adventurers of Newcastle-upon-Tyne.

Background
Henry Anderson was the son of the Newcastle-upon-Tyne merchant John Anderson and his wife Marian Lockwood, the daughter of Thomas Lockwood of Richmondshire, Yorkshire. Thomas Lockwood had previously been Sheriff (1471–72) and Mayor (1488–89) of Newcastle-upon-Tyne.

Career

Anderson was Sheriff (1520–21), Alderman (by 1524) then Mayor of Newcastle-upon-Tyne (1532–33, 1539–40, 1542–43, 1546–47). He was elected to represent the town in the Reformation Parliament in 1529 and may even have been elected in 1523, 1536, 1539 and 1542.

During the Pilgrimage of Grace, he was among the Newcastle Mayor and Aldermen who were praised for resisting the rebellion. During his time as Mayor, Anderson was appointed as keeper of Newcastle's Dominican Friary in 1539. Anderson also provided ships and resources for the army and Royal Naval fleet during the war with Scotland in 1543. Four years later, in 1547, he became the first Governor of the newly founded Merchant Adventurers of Newcastle-upon-Tyne.

Anderson made his will in January 1559 and seems likely to have died shortly afterwards (and buried at St Nicholas's Church, Newcastle) since an inventory of his estate was made in March 1559.

Family

Anderson married Anne Orde, the daughter of Robert Orde of Orde, Northumberland. They had ten children, including four sons: Bertram (1505–71), Francis, Henry and Clement.

He was the founder of a political dynasty – his son, Bertram (1505–1571), grandson Henry (1545–1605) and great-grandson Sir Henry (1582–1659) were all MPs, Mayors and Sheriffs of Newcastle-upon-Tyne during the sixteenth and seventeenth centuries.

Arms

Ancestry

References

1484 births
Anderson family of Newcastle-upon-Tyne
English MPs 1529–1536
Mayors of Newcastle upon Tyne
Politicians from Newcastle upon Tyne
1559 deaths